Needlework is decorative sewing and textile arts handicrafts.  Anything that uses a needle for construction can be called needlework. Needlework may include related textile crafts such as crochet, worked with a hook, or tatting, worked with a shuttle.

Similar abilities often transfer well between different varieties of needlework, such as fine motor skill and knowledge of textile fibers.  Some of the same tools may be used in several different varieties of needlework.

According to the Ladies' Needlework Penny Magazine:

There are many women who persuade themselves that the occupations particularly allotted to their sex are extremely frivolous; but it is one of the common errors of a depraved taste to confound simplicity with frivolity. The use of the needle is simple, but not frivolous.

Background

Needlework was an important fact of women's identity during the Victorian age, including embroidery, netting, knitting, crochet, and Berlin wool work. A growing middle class had more leisure time than ever before; printed materials offered homemakers thousands of patterns. Women were still limited to roles in the household, and under the standards of the time a woman working on needle work while entertaining the parlor was considered beautiful. According to one publication from 1843: "Never is beauty and feminine grace so attractive as, when engaged in the honorable discharge of household duties, and domestic cares."

Fancy work was distinguished from plain sewing and it was a mark of a prosperous and well-managed home to display handmade needlework. While plain sewing was often handed over to servants, even in middle class households, fancy work would often be done while entertaining guests, in the afternoons, evenings, or on Sundays. The types of goods that could be decorated with needlework techniques was limited only be the imagination: knitted boots, embroidered book covers, footstools, lampshades, sofa cushions, fans and on and on.

Types 
 Needle lace/Lace-making
 Quilting
 Appliqué
 Embroidery
 Crochet
 Knitting
 Sewing
 Tatting
 Lucet
 Macramé
 Braiding and tassel making
 Tapestry
 Needlepoint
 Bead weaving:  loom and off-loom

See also 
 Royal School of Needlework
 Kasidakari

References

External links

 Art in Needlework: A Book about Embroidery by  Mary Buckle and Lewis F. Day, available through Project Gutenberg 
 Beeton's Book of Needlework by Isabella Mary Beeton, available through Project Gutenberg 
 Encyclopedia of Needlework by Therese de Dillmont, available through Project Gutenberg